Baghdad, located in Iraq, was once the capital of the Abbasid Caliphate and a center of Islamic advancements. This is a list of mosques in Baghdad from different dynastic periods. Today, there are 912 Jama Masjids in Baghdad which conduct Friday Prayer, and 149 smaller mosques which only hold regular daily prayers.

Abbasids

Turco-Persian

Ottomans

Modern

Unknown

See also
 Iraqi art
 List of mosques in Iraq

References

External links

 Baghdad Mosques, GlobalSecurity.org

 
Baghdad
Mosques in Baghdad